The Laporte rule is a rule that explains the intensities of absorption spectra for chemical species.  It is a selection rule that rigorously applies to chromophores that are centrosymmetric, i.e. with an inversion centre. It states that electronic transitions that conserve parity are forbidden. Thus transitions between states that are symmetric with respect to an inversion centre will not be observed.  Transitions between states that are antisymmetric with respect to inversion are forbidden as well. In the language of symmetry, g (gerade = even (German)) → g and u (ungerade = odd) → u transitions are forbidden.  Allowed transitions in such molecules must involve a change in parity, either g → u or u → g.

The Laporte rule stipulates that s to s, p to p, d to d, etc. transitions should not be observed in centrosymmetric compounds. Practically speaking, only d-d transitions occur in the visible region of the spectrum. Thus, the Laporte rule is most commonly discussed in the context of the electronic spectroscopy of transition metals complexes.

Optical properties of transition metal complexes
Octahedral complexes have a center of symmetry and thus should show no d-d bands.  In fact, such bands are observed, but are weak, having intensities orders of magnitude weaker than "allowed" bands. The extinction coefficients for d-d bands are in the range 5–200.

The allowedness of d-d bands arises because the centre of symmetry for these chromophores is disrupted for various reasons. The Jahn–Teller effect is one such cause. Complexes are not perfectly symmetric all the time. Transitions that occur as a result of an asymmetrical vibration of a molecule are called vibronic transitions, such as those caused by vibronic coupling. Through such asymmetric vibrations, transitions are weakly allowed.

The Laporte rule is powerful because it applies to complexes that deviate from idealized Oh symmetry.  For example, the d-d transitions for [Cr(NH3)5Cl]2+ are weak (ε < 100) even though the complex is only of C4v symmetry.

The Laporte rule helps explain the intense colors often observed for the tetrahedral complexes.  The tetrahedral point group lacks the inversion operation, so the Laporte rule does not apply.  Illustrative of this effect are the disparate extinction coefficients for octahedral vs tetrahedral complexes of Co(II).  For [Co(H2O)6]2+, which is pink, ε ≈ 10.  For [CoCl4]2-, which is deep blue, ε ≈ 600.

Note on spin-selection rule
Complementing the Laporte rule, is the spin-selection rule, which forbids transitions that involve changes in spin state.  Violations of both the Laporte and spin-selection rules results in particularly low extinction coefficients.  Illustrative of this combined effect is the faintness of even concentrated solutions of octahedral Mn(II) and Fe(III) complexes.

History
The rule is named after Otto Laporte.

See also
 Ligand field theory
 Tanabe–Sugano diagram
 Selection rule

References

Absorption spectroscopy